Shui Tsiu San Tsuen is a village in Shap Pat Heung, Yuen Long District, Hong Kong. Part of the village is a historic walled village.

Administration
Shui Tsiu San Tsuen is a recognized village under the New Territories Small House Policy.

History
Shui Tsiu San Tsuen was a Hakka village inhabited by the Yeung and the Wong who worked for the Tang Clan as early as the mid-17th century. They were later joined by the Ching, the Lam and the Cheung.

See also
 Walled villages of Hong Kong
 Shui Tsiu Lo Wai

References

External links

 Delineation of area of existing village Shui Chiu San Tsuen (Shap Pat heung) for election of resident representative (2019 to 2022)
 Antiquities Advisory Board. Pictures of Fuk Hing Tong (Shrine), No. 121 Shui Tsiu San Tsuen

Walled villages of Hong Kong
Shap Pat Heung
Villages in Yuen Long District, Hong Kong